Kannamangalam, previously referred as  Mangalam is a  panchayat town in Tiruvanamalai district in the Indian state of Tamil Nadu. It is located around 21 km from Vellore. Places with the suffix "mangalam" were believed to have been given as charity  by the Kings of a particular reign, "Kannamangalam" was thus named by the same criteria. The Naganathi River, which passes through locality serve the water needs of the town during seasonal periods. Mudaliars and Muslims form the majority of the population in Kannamangalam town. Where as, Vanniyars are abundant in neighbouring villages.

Demographics
 India census, Kannamangalam had a population of 7399. Males constitute 49% of the population and females 51%. Kannamangalam has an average literacy rate of 75%, higher than the national average of 59.5%: male literacy is 83%, and female literacy is 67%. In Kannamangalam, 10% of the population is under 6 years of age.

Schools and Colleges 

 Desia Matriculation Higher Secondary School. Kattukkanalur Village Panchayat
 Girls Higher Secondary School, Kattukkanalur Village Panchayat
 Government Higher Secondary School, Kattukkanalur Village Panchayat
 Vel's Vidhyashram Matriculation Higher Secondary School.
 Little rose nursery and primary school, Kilvallam.
 St Mary’s School of Nursing, Mttukudisai

Transport 
Buses serving Kannamangalam:

 11C --> Vellore to Ananthapuram via Kannamangalam
 11C --> Vellore to Padavedu via Kannamangalam

There are also other private service buses like Sri Krishna Services, Kannagi, Janatha travels passing through the area offering good connectivity.

References 

Cities and towns in Tiruvannamalai district